The European Design Awards, also known as the ED-Awards, are annual awards presented to European designers for outstanding work in the communication design field. The ED-Awards is a joint initiative of design magazines from across Europe and endorsed by the International Council of Design.
The ED-Awards are judged by a panel of representatives (journalists and design critics) from fifteen European design magazines, while the winning submissions are featured in the ED-Awards Catalogue.

Model
The ED-Awards is different from other design awards schemes in that the jury is not made up of designers, but of design journalists and critics – people who see and judge work for a living.
Further more, since the ED-Awards organisation is made up of design magazines, it provides an opportunity for everyone submitting work, to have it featured in a number of these media. A lot of stories and articles are created through the submitted work every year.

Jury

The jury consists of fifteen representatives from high-profile European design magazines.
designaustria, Austria
TYPO, Czech Republic
grafia, Finland
étapes:, France
novum, Germany
+design, Greece
Progetto Grafico , Italy
BNO Vormberichten, The Netherlands
2+3D, Poland
[kAk) , Russia
Visual, Spain
CAP&Design, Sweden
IDPURE, Switzerland
Grafik Tasarim, Turkey
Eye, UK

Categories

There are 35 award categories, in seven groups, covering branding, packaging, exhibition design, typography, digital design, illustration and self-promotion, among others. There are also three special distinctions: Agency of the year, Best of show and Jury prize.

European Design Agency of the year

The top accolade in the ED-Awards is every time, the distinction bestowed upon the most (creatively) successful studio of the continent. This title has so far been awarded to:
2008 Beetroot Design Group, Greece
2010 Lava Design, the Netherlands
2011 Les Graphiquants, France
2012 Silo, the Netherlands
2013 Jaeger & Jaeger, Germany
2014 R2, Portugal
2015 Ermolaev Bureau, Russia
2016 Raffinerie AG für Gestaltung, Switzerland
2017 Silo, the Netherlands
2018 Vruchtvlees, the Netherlands
2019 Kind, Norway 
2020 ANTI, Norway 
2021 WePlayDesign, Switzerland 
2022 Verve, the Netherlands

Host cities

Each year's results are announced during a ceremony which is hosted in a different European city. So far, the European Design Awards ceremonies (and accompanying events) have been hosted by:
  Athens, Greece (2007)
  Stockholm, Sweden (2008)
  Zurich, Switzerland (2009)
  Rotterdam, the Netherlands (2010)
  Vilnius, Lithuania (2011)
  Helsinki, Finland (2012)
  Belgrade, Serbia (2013)
  Cologne, Germany (2014)
  Istanbul, Turkey (2015)
  Vienna, Austria (2016)
  Porto, Portugal (2017) 
  Oslo, Norway (2018)
  Warsaw, Poland (2019) 
 The 2020   and 2021  events that were scheduled to take place in Valencia, Spain had to be cancelled due to the COVID-19 pandemic
  Tallinn, Estonia (2022) 
  Luxembourg city, Luxembourg (2023)

Related links
 German Design Award
 Red Dot

References

External links
Official European Design Awards site
2013 Winners

Communication design
Design awards
Design
Graphic design